South-Central Minzu University (SCMZU; ; colloquially 中南民大, Pinyin: Zhōngnán mínDà) is a national university located in Hubei province's capital Wuhan, directly under the State Ethnic Affairs Commission of PRC. It is a comprehensive university founded in 1951 as South Central College for Nationalities. In March 2002, the school adopted the name South Central University for Nationalities. It is one of the six national higher education institutes for ethnic groups in China.

Development and honor
In recent years, SCMZU has made a steady and rapid development. It was graded as “excellence” in the undergraduate teaching assessment by the Ministry of Education in 2001. It developed from a college into a university and renamed into South-Central University for Nationalities in 2002 (Latterly changed into South-Central Minzu University). In September 2003, it became a university co-supported by the State of Ethnic Affairs and the Municipal Government of Wuhan. It won the honor as “Model Institute for National Ethnic Unity” in May 2005, awarded by the State Council. In 2006, SCMZU was again graded as “excellence” in the undergraduate teaching assessment. In 2008, it won the title “Model Institute” granted by the State of Ethnic Affairs, and the third prize for its great achievement in “The Higher Education Campus Culture Construction” granted by the Ministry of Education. For the last consecutive 10 years, it has been awarded for five times the honor of “Model Institute in Hubei Province.”

During the last six decades, more than 100,000 students graduated from SCMZU.

Campus
South-Central Minzu University boasts a campus of 1500 mu (100 ha), with construction area of 1,000,000 square meters, a modern-facilitated library with 2.8 million books and the first museum of ethnology in Chinese universities.

Staff and faculty
1,240 Full-time faculty 
168 Professors  
407 Associate Professors 
365 PhD and master supervisors 
32 Provincial-level experts 
29 Teachers enjoying State council Special Allowance
79% Teachers with PhD or master's degree

Courses and programs
68 Undergraduate majors  
19 research-oriented MA program (Category I discipline)
72 research-oriented MA program (Category II discipline)
10 Professional master's degree program 
1 PhD program (Category I discipline) 
5 PhD program (Category II discipline)

Colleges and schools
School of Law
School of Literature and Journalism
School of Fine Arts()
School of Ethnology and Sociology
School of Foreign Languages
School of Economics
School of Management
School of Public Administration
School of Marxism
School of Computer Science
School of Mathematics and Statistics
School of Electronic and Information Engineering
School of Biomedical Engineering
School of Chemistry and Materials Science
School of Life Sciences
School of Pharmaceutical Sciences
School of Physical Education
School of Music and Dance
School of Education
School of Resources and Environment
School of Preparatory Education
School of Continuing Education

Education and research

Key laboratories and research institutes
Laboratory of Catalysis and Materials Science
Laboratory of Agricultural Technology Research and Development
Laboratory of China Minority Pharmacy
Laboratory of Electronic and Information Engineering
Laboratory of Biotechnology
Wuhan Institute for Neuroscience & Neuroengineering
The Soft Science Research Base of Low-carbon Development and Cleaner Production
Ethnic Minority Study Center of South China
Aesthetic Culture Study Center of Minority in South-central China

Key disciplines (provincial/ministerial level)
Ethnology (Category I discipline)
Ethnology
Marxist Minority Theory and Policy
History of China Minorities
Art of China Minorities
Economy of China Minorities
Theory of Literature and Art
Technology of Computer Application
Analytical Chemistry
Organic Chemistry
Physical Chemistry
Biomedical Engineering
Linguistics and Linguistics Application of Foreign Languages
Jurisprudence
Educational Economy and Management

Research and academic achievements (2006-2010)
48 Research institutes and centers
14 Authorized patents 
169 Awards for scientific and technological achievements 
172 Published books
4,229 Published academic papers

External links
Official website of South-Central Minzu University
Official English website of South-Central Minzu University
International Education College of SCMZU
Confucius Institute Scholarship of SCMZU

Educational institutions established in 1951
Universities and colleges in Wuhan
1951 establishments in China
Minzu Universities